The South Africa national cricket team toured the West Indies from March to May 2005 to play four Test matches and five One Day Internationals (ODIs).

Squads

Test series summary

South Africa won the series 2–0 with two matches drawn.

1st Test

2nd Test

3rd Test

4th Test

ODI series summary

1st ODI

2nd ODI

3rd ODI

4th ODI

5th ODI

References

Notes

2005 in South African cricket
International cricket competitions in 2005
2005
West Indian cricket seasons from 2000–01
2005 in West Indian cricket